Uncial 0274 (in the Gregory-Aland numbering), is a Greek uncial manuscript of the New Testament. Paleographically it has been assigned to the 5th century.

Description 

The codex contains a small parts of the Gospel of Mark 6-10, on 4 parchment leaves (28 cm by 33 cm). The text is written in two columns per page, 30 lines per page, in uncial letters. It is a palimpsest.

Contents  

The codex contains: Gospel of Mark 6:56-7:4.6-9.13-17.19-23.29-29.34-35; 8:3-4.8-11; 9:20-22.26-41; 9:43-10:1.17-22. 

Currently it is dated by the INTF to the 5th century.

Text 
The Greek text of this codex probably is a representative of the Alexandrian text-type. According to Kurt and Barbara Aland it does not support the Byzantine text against the original, it agrees 6 times with the Byzantine when it has the same reading as the original text. It agrees 19 times with the original text against the Byzantine. It has 2 independent or distinctive readings. Alands placed it with hesitation in Category II.

Aland gave the following textual profile for it: 01 61/2 192 2S.

Location 
After discovering it was held in Cairo. Currently the codex is housed at the Coptic Museum (6569/6571) in Cairo.

See also 

 List of New Testament uncials
 Textual criticism

References

Further reading 

 J. M. Plumley and C. H. Roberts, "An Uncial Text of St. Mark in Greek from Nubia", JTS XXVII (1976), 34-45. 
 W. H. C. Frend and I. A. Muirhead, "The Greek Manuscripts from the Cathedral of Q'asr Ibrim", Muséon 89 (1976), 43-49. 
 G. M. Browne, "The Sunnati Mark", ZPE 66 (1986), 49-52.

External links 

 Uncial 0274 at the Wieland Willker, "Textual Commentary"

Greek New Testament uncials
5th-century biblical manuscripts